The.Lost.Innocent is the third studio album by Japanese rock band Fanatic Crisis and their second major label release. It was released on the label For Life on February 24, 1999. The first edition featured a white digipack with a velcrow strap, while the second edition, with remastered sound, was released in a jewel case with a black cover.

Track listing

Personnel 
Tsutomu Ishizuki − vocals
Kazuya − lead guitar
Shun − rhythm guitar
Ryuji − bass
Tohru − drums

References

Fanatic Crisis albums
1999 albums